Marie Adams (1925–1998), was an American singer.

Marie Adams may also refer to:

Marie Adams, character in Howling IV: The Original Nightmare

See also
Kelly-Marie Adams, River City character
Mary Adams (disambiguation)
Maria Adams (disambiguation)